Jon Garth Murray (November 16, 1954 – September 29, 1995) served as president of American Atheists, a non-governmental organization that lobbied on the separation of church and state. He was the second son of Madalyn Murray O'Hair, an activist who founded American Atheists in 1963 and served as its first president. He was the half-brother of William J. Murray.

Career and activism
From 1986 until his death in 1995, Murray held the de jure office of President of American Atheists.  It was a title without power, however, as his mother retained authoritative control behind-the-scenes.

Personal life and death
Jon Garth Murray, called "Garth", was born in Baltimore, Maryland in 1954, the son of Madalyn Murray O'Hair and Michael Fiorillo, her boyfriend at the time. It is likely that Garth never met his father. In 1960 his mother filed a lawsuit against the Baltimore public school system, naming his older half-brother William J. Murray as plaintiff. Consolidated with another case, it reached the United States Supreme Court on appeal, which ruled that mandatory public Bible readings in public schools were unconstitutional. 

That year his mother founded American Atheists and served for decades as the first president. Murray also worked for the organization as an adult. 

He is thought to have had only one, short-lived relationship with a woman.  He was a tall, heavyset man and had a speech impairment. He was living with his mother Madalyn in 1995, together with his niece Robin Murray O'Hair in Austin, Texas. (His mother had adopted her granddaughter Robin, making her Garth's adopted sister). 

In 1995, Murray, his mother, and his niece Robin were all kidnapped and killed in San Antonio by David Roland Waters, a former employee of American Atheists. Waters committed these crimes in association with two other men.

Remembrance
In 2012, a memorial brick for Murray, his mother Madalyn Murray O'Hair, and his niece Robin was placed at Lou Neff Point in Zilker Park in Austin, Texas.

References

1954 births
1995 deaths
American atheism activists
American murder victims
People from Austin, Texas
People murdered in Texas
Male murder victims
Kidnapped American people
20th-century atheists